{{DISPLAYTITLE:CH5NO}}
The molecular formula CH5NO (molar mass: 47.057 g/mol) may refer to:

 Aminomethanol, or methanolamine
 Methoxyamine, or O-methylhydroxylamine
 N-Methylhydroxylamine, or methylhydroxylamine